Nitin Nohria (born February 9, 1962) is an Indian-American academic. He served as the tenth dean of Harvard Business School. He is also the George F. Baker Professor of Administration. He is also a former non-executive director of Tata Sons.

Early life and education
Nitin Nohria was born in Nohar Rajasthan in baniya (traders) family, India. His father, Kewal Nohria, was the former chairman of Crompton Greaves in India, and was one of the reasons Nohria decided to embark upon a career in business.

Nohria attended high school at St. Columba's School in New Delhi, India. He earned a B.Tech in Chemical Engineering at the Indian Institute of Technology Bombay, graduating in 1984, and then received an MBA from Jamnalal Bajaj Institute of Management Studies at the University of Mumbai. He earned a PhD in Management from the Sloan School of Management at Massachusetts Institute of Technology in 1988.

Career

Nohria served as co-chair of the HBS Leadership Initiative and sat on the executive committee of the University's interfaculty initiative on advanced leadership. Nohria is working with fellow HBS professor Rakesh Khurana, the World Economic Forum and the Aspen Institute to create a business oath, like the MBA Oath,  that might be used globally.  In a Harvard Business Review piece published in October 2008, Khurana and Nohria linked the connection between professionalism of a profession and the profession's ability to deliver value to society.

On May 4, 2010, Drew Gilpin Faust, President of Harvard University, appointed him as the Dean of Harvard Business School, effective July 1, 2010. He is the second HBS Dean, after John H. McArthur, born outside the United States and the first Dean since Dean Fouraker in the 1970s to live in the Dean's House on the HBS campus. In January 2014, he tendered an apology on behalf of Harvard Business School for the perceived sexism at the school.

In August 2017, Nohria argued that President Donald Trump's support for "isolationism" was detrimental to American economic prosperity, as it discouraged successful foreigners from immigrating to the United States.

In November 2019, Nohria announced that he would step down as dean in June 2020 but, in light of the COVID-19 outbreak, Nohria decided to stay on as dean through the end of 2020. Srikant Datar took over for him beginning January 1, 2021. 

Nohria has won several awards and honors including the 2008 McKinsey Award for the best article in Harvard Business Review for "How Do CEOs Manage Their Time?" and the 2005 PricewaterhouseCoopers Best Article Award for "How to Build Collaborative Advantage".

Criticism

Race issues
In 2013, a lengthy front-page article in The New York Times described HBS efforts to deal with gender inequality. In 2014, Nohria apologized for HBS on how it had sometimes treated its female students and professors offensively.

Under Nohria as dean for 10 years at Harvard Business School, there was a low percentage of African Americans as enrolled MBA students and had nine out of 270 faculty members in the faculty who were black. A faculty member Steven S. Rogers stepped down from teaching at the business school because it had long given short shrift to the black experience and had maintained anti-African practices.

In June 2020, Nohria publicly apologized for failing to mount a more successful fight against racism and pledged to move urgently forward with what he called an “anti-racism action plan.”

Personal life
Nohria is married with two daughters, both of whom currently attend Harvard College. Nohria earned "$727,365 in salary and benefits in 2014."

References

External links
 Dean Nitin Nohria (Archived) - Harvard Business School
 Standing and acting together for racial justice (Archived) - Harvard Business School
 Business School Dean Nitin Nohria Announces New Anti-Racist Efforts After Criticism - The Harvard Crimson

Academics of London Business School
American business writers
Indian emigrants to the United States
Harvard Business School faculty
Harvard University faculty
IIT Bombay alumni
Living people
St. Columba's School, Delhi alumni
Jamnalal Bajaj Institute of Management Studies alumni
MIT Sloan School of Management alumni
American male writers of Indian descent
American people of Punjabi descent
American academics of Indian descent
Business school deans
Indian academic administrators
1962 births
American male non-fiction writers
Business educators